Worldbeat is the debut album by Kaoma, released in 1989. It provided three hit singles, two of them achieving success worldwide: "Lambada", "Dançando Lambada" and "Mélodie d'amour". The album is composed of songs in Portuguese, Spanish and English. It was ranked in the top 25 in Switzerland, Germany, Norway, Australia and Austria. It topped the Billboard Latin Pop in the U.S.

Critical reception
The album received generally positive reviews from critics. AllMusic wrote: "Not outstanding but definitely appealing, this CD effectively combines South American elements with dance music/disco, reggae and hip-hop. One hears Chic's influence on the funky 'Sopenala'."

Track listings
 "Lambada" — 3:27
 "Lambareggae" — 3:52
 "Dançando Lambada" — 4:44
 "Lambamor" — 4:09
 "Lamba caribe" — 4:07
 "Mélodie d'amour" — 4:11
 "Sindiang" — 3:58
 "Sopenala" — 4:28
 "Jambé finète (grille)" — 4:26
 "Salsa nuestra" — 4:38

Charts

Weekly charts

Year-end charts

Certifications and sales

See also
List of number-one Billboard Latin Pop Albums from the 1990s
 List of best-selling Latin albums

References

1989 debut albums
Kaoma albums